Mentophobia or mentaphobia is a concept described by Donald Griffin, an American zoologist and the founder of cognitive ethology, to denote strong resistance from scientists to the idea that animals, other than humans, are conscious. Griffin argued that there is a taboo "against scientific consideration of private, conscious, mental experiences" that leads to the minimization of the significance of the consciousness of non-human animals, as well as human consciousness and asserted that this presents a significant barrier to scientific progress.

Mentophobia has been likened to Frans de Waal's concept of anthropodenial: "a blindness to the humanlike characteristics of other animals, or the animal-like characteristics of ourselves". It has also been compared with an observation by Daniel Dennett that "a curious asymmetry can be observed" when it comes to the certainty of human consciousness not being required for moral certainty, but moral certainty is not applied when it comes to the experiences of other animals.

David Chauvet in Contre la Mentaphobie ("Against Mentaphobia"), argues that the denial of the consciousness of animals alleviates the guilt that is associated with abuses directed towards them.

References

Further reading 

 

Animal cognition
Animal ethics
Consciousness